Diego Moyano was the defending champion, but was forced to withdraw due to an injury.

Marcelo Ríos won the title by defeating Edgardo Massa 6–4, 6–2 in the final.

Seeds

Draw

Finals

Top half

Bottom half

References

External links
 Official results archive (ATP)
 Official results archive (ITF)

2001 in Chilean tennis